Otto Weekhout (born 24 November 1941) is a Dutch rower. He competed in the men's coxed four event at the 1968 Summer Olympics.

References

1941 births
Living people
Dutch male rowers
Olympic rowers of the Netherlands
Rowers at the 1968 Summer Olympics
Sportspeople from Delft